The Réserve écologique André-Linteau (André-Linteau Ecological Reserve) is an ecological reserve in Quebec, Canada.
It  protects a high quality forest of white pine growing beside the Ottawa River.

Location

It is roughly rectangular, bounded by Ferris Brook to the northwest, the Ottawa River to the southwest and southeast, and a straight line to the northeast.

It is an Ecological reserve with IUCN protected area categories IA (Strict Nature Reserve), designated in 1993.
The reserve is named after André Linteau (1910–66), the first doctor of silviculture in Quebec.
It is one of three ecological reserves in or near the Dumoine River watershed, the other two being the Aigle-à-Tête-Blanche Ecological Reserve and the James-Little Ecological Reserve.

Terrain

The bedrock is mostly made up of crystalline gneiss, quartzite and limestone.
There are covered with glacial tills of varying thickness.
The thick sandy and silty surface deposits are mostly recent, formed as terraces at the mouth of the Ferris stream.

Vegetation

The reserve  protects a high quality forest of white pine growing on a deposit of thick sand.
The site is dominated by white pines, including large diameter trees and excellent regeneration of pines in the gaps, with some occurrences of red pine, large-tooth aspen, trembling aspen and red maple.
Forests of this type were once common in the region, but are now rare.

Notes

Sources

Protected areas of Outaouais
Protected areas established in 1993
1993 establishments in Quebec